István Szedlacsek (born 26 August 1966) is a retired Hungarian football striker.

References

1964 births
Living people
Hungarian footballers
Vác FC players
Nagykanizsai SC footballers
Association football forwards